Ptichodis fasciata is a moth of the family Erebidae first described by E. Dukinfield Jones in 1921. It is found in Paraná, Brazil.

References

Moths described in 1921
Ptichodis
Moths of South America